Iris Cabral (1906 – June 1936) was an Afro-Uruguayan feminist and labor activist.

Life
Cabral organized the first domestic workers' union in Uruguay. In the 1930s she and Clementina Silva founded the first Anti-Fascist Committee of Uruguay. She and Maruja Pereyra were the "most visible, militant and outspoken" contributors to the Afro-Uruguayan paper Nuestra Raza after it was restarted in 1933. Both Cabral and Pereyra participated in the April 1936 National Congress of Women. However, Cabral died young in June 1936.

Legacy
Pereyra remembered Cabral in glowing terms:

In 2016 Cabral's memory was honoured by the legislature of Montevideo.

References

1906 births
1936 deaths
Uruguayan feminists
Uruguayan trade unionists
Uruguayan people of African descent
Women trade unionists